The Serbian Rugby League is the governing body for the sport of rugby league football in Serbia. The Association was formed in 2001 in Kruševac. They have been full members of the RLEF from August 2011.

See also

 Rugby league in Serbia
 Serbia national rugby league team

References

External links

Rugby league governing bodies
Rugby league in Serbia
Rugby League
Sports organizations established in 2001
2001 establishments in Serbia